K. und K. Feldmarschall (aka Der falsche Feldmarschall) is a comedy film from Czechoslovakia, released in 1930.

It is the German-language version of Imperial and Royal Field Marshal (1930). There is also a French-language version Monsieur le maréchal (1931).

External links
 

1930 films
1930 comedy films
Czechoslovak black-and-white films
Films directed by Karel Lamač
Czechoslovak multilingual films
1930s German-language films
Czechoslovak comedy films
1930 multilingual films
1930s Czech films